Loudness is the tenth studio album by Japanese band Loudness. It was released in 1992 only in Japan, after the band had terminated the recording contracts with US labels. Original bass player Masayoshi Yamashita was replaced with former X Japan bassist Taiji Sawada and the American vocalist Mike Vescera with former Ezo singer Masaki Yamada.

The sound of this album is much more aggressive and the rhythms much faster than the preceding offerings from the band. This fact has been interpreted as a reaction by composer and producer Takasaki to the many compromises he had to accept by US managers and producers to remain in the record market in the United States. Also, the music has a much more traditional heavy metal feel to it overall, whereas their previous output from the late 80's had a very glam-oriented melodic sound to it.

The cover art is designed by artist Tadanori Yokoo. The limited edition of the album came with a special booklet and CD case, guitar picks, band name logo sticker and a T-shirt signed by the band. The album reached No. 2 in Japan on the Oricon Charts, making it Loudness' highest-charting and best-selling album in Japan. A live album, recorded in 1992, Once and for All, and a live Laserdisc and VHS, Welcome to the Slaughter House, also recorded in 1992 at Nakano Sun Plaza, were also released.

Track listing

Personnel
Loudness
Masaki Yamada - lead and backing vocals
Akira Takasaki - guitars, producer
Taiji Sawada - bass
Munetaka Higuchi - drums

Additional musicians
Jody Gray - demon rapper on "Twisted", vocal producer
Neil Coty, Phil Goodbody - backing vocals

Production
Eric Westfall, Mark Corbin, Julio Pena, Makoto Furukawa - engineers
Eiji Ohta, Richard Scott, Takahiro Sakai - assistant engineers
Scott Mabuchi - mixing
Makoto Takahashi - mixing assistant
Tony Dawsey - mastering at Masterdisk, New York

Charts

References

1992 albums
Loudness (band) albums
Warner Music Japan albums